Oliver Samuel Edward Michael Campbell (February 25, 1871 – July 11, 1953) was an American male tennis player who won the three consecutive singles titles at the U.S. Championships from 1890 through 1892.

Education 
Campbell was educated at Columbia College, graduating in 1891 and was posthumously inducted into the Athletics Hall of Fame in 2010.

Career
For over a century, Campbell had the honour of being the youngest male player to win the U.S. singles title. He did it as a 19-year, 6 months and 9 days old student in 1890. That record went to fellow American Pete Sampras, 19 years and 28 days, when he won the title in 1990.

Campbell defended his title in the challenge round matches in 1891, defeating Clarence Hobart, and in 1892, defeating Fred Hovey, but did not defend it in 1893 and thereby defaulted the title to Robert Wrenn. The challenge round against Clarence Hobart was the first title match played over five sets.

In addition to his singles titles Campbell won the men's doubles titles at the U.S. National Championships in 1888, 1891 and 1892.

Campbell was inducted into the International Tennis Hall of Fame in 1955.

Grand Slam finals

Singles (3 titles)

Doubles (3 titles, 2 runner-ups)

References

External links 
 
 

  

1871 births
1953 deaths
19th-century American people
19th-century male tennis players
American male tennis players
Sportspeople from Brooklyn
International Tennis Hall of Fame inductees
Tennis people from New York (state)
United States National champions (tennis)
Grand Slam (tennis) champions in men's singles
Grand Slam (tennis) champions in men's doubles
Columbia Lions men's tennis players